The 2016 Boyd Tinsley Women's Clay Court Classic was a professional tennis tournament played on outdoor clay courts. It was the fifteenth edition of the tournament and part of the 2016 ITF Women's Circuit, offering a total of $50,000 in prize money. It took place in Charlottesville, Virginia, United States, on 25 April–1 May 2016.

Singles main draw entrants

Seeds 

 1 Rankings as of 18 April 2016.

Other entrants 
The following players received wildcards into the singles main draw:
  Danielle Collins
  Kayla Day
  Michaela Gordon
  Taylor Townsend

The following players received entry from the qualifying draw:
  Raveena Kingsley
  Tara Moore
  Olivia Rogowska
  Alexandra Stevenson

The following players received entry from by a lucky loser spot:
  Sanaz Marand

The following player received entry by a protected ranking:
  Heidi El Tabakh

Champions

Singles

 Taylor Townsend def.  Grace Min, 7–5, 6–1

Doubles

 Asia Muhammad /  Taylor Townsend def.  Alexandra Panova /  Shelby Rogers, 7–6(7–4), 6–0

External links 
 2016 Hardee's Pro Classic at ITFtennis.com
 Official website

2016 ITF Women's Circuit
Boydtinsley
Tennis tournaments in the United States